David Douglas High School (DDHS) is a public high school in Portland, Oregon, United States. It is a part of the David Douglas School District.

In 1998 Lynn Olson, author of The School-to-work Revolution: How Employers And Educators Are Joining Forces To Prepare Tomorrow's Skilled Workforce, said that David Douglas was "a clean, orderly, comfortable school, the kind that sprouted up all over the country in the baby boom years of the 1950s and 1960s."

History
The school is named after 19th-century Scottish botanist David Douglas, namesake of such Pacific Northwest species as the Douglas fir. Originally established in 1954, enrollment at DDHS increased quickly in subsequent years as development in suburban Portland expanded, eventually becoming one of the largest high schools in the area.

In 2009 around 20 students at David Douglas, all a part of the East Precinct Youth Advisory Council, created a traffic enforcement mission at the campus in cooperation with the Portland Police Department east precinct.

Campus
The school has seven buildings.  The first, referred to as the North Building, is dedicated to academic courses.  Second is the South Building, a place for vocational fine arts.  Next to the North is the pool building where health and financial classes are taught, along with a few strays.  The social studies building was opened in 2007.  The PAC is across from the South Building, and is where music and theatre courses are held, along with two theatres.  One is a standard stadium seating theatre and the other, downstairs, is referred to as the "black box theatre".  The East Campus is where the public and students with children are offered daycare.  This provides the tools for child development classes.  East Campus is several blocks away from the main building.  David Douglas also has a garage for the automotives students located in the far corner of the parking lot behind the football stadium.  The school is within a neighborhood that consists of small single-family houses.

Academics
In 2008, 67% of the school's seniors received a high school diploma. Of 748 students, 500 graduated, 141 dropped out, 19 received a modified diploma, and 88 were still in high school the following year.

Project STARS
Anthony Palerimini, the superintendent, said, "We were doing an excellent job of providing a well-rounded college prep education. But it wasn't relevant to 25 to 30 percent of our students." The program introduced students to various career fields. The Oregon Business Council, an organization representing forty chief executive officers from the largest companies in the state, partnered with the David Douglas district in implementing the program.

When each student was in high school, he or she selected one of six "constellations" (concentrations) in which he or she would concentrate his or her electives in. Each constellation requires a student to take a capstone course, related courses, job shadows, and work experience. The Oregon Business Council implemented committees, together with 12 members, to develop a business and administration certificate of advanced mastery and a production and technology certification of advanced mastery. In the fall of 1994 the district planned to begin offering courses in these areas, and planned to add four more certificates in the 1995–1996 school year.

In 1994 the Associated Press referred to the David Douglas School District as "a leader in Oregon's movement toward more career-oriented schools" due to the school-to-work program courses. The AP added that "It may serve as a model for other districts as they forge new ties with the world of work."

Demographics
As of 2019, the school had 2,729 students. 716 9th grade students, 736 10th grade students, 660 11th grade students and 617 12th grade students. Of the 2,729 students 25.9% were Hispanic, .6% Native American,  18.6% Asian, 11.8% Black, 2% Pacific Islander, 34.7% White, and 6.3% Multi.

14% of students were on a reduced lunch program, and 55.5% were on a free lunch program totaling 69.5%.

The Highlander
The Highlander is published monthly by the Advanced Journalism class, and has a circulation of 2,000. It is printed by the Gresham Outlook.

The Highlander has won the following awards:
 American Scholastic Press, First Place, 1995-2008
 Northwest Scholastic Press, First Place, 1994–2000, 2002–2005, 2008

Awards and honors 
In 1996, David Douglas was honored as one of the ten original New American High Schools "showcase sites", serving as a model for other public schools around the nation, due in part to the David Douglas Model District Partnership and the "academic constellations" created through Project STARS (Students Taking Authentic Routes to Success).

Sports

State championships
 Boys' swimming: 1968, 1969, 1970, 1971, 1972, 1973, 1974, 1976, 1977, 1978, 1982, 1983, 1985, 2008
 Girls' swimming: 1967, 1968, 1969, 1970, 1971, 1972, 1973, 1974, 1975, 1976, 1977, 1978, 1979, 1980, 1981
 Dance team: 1983, 1995, 1997, 2000
 Boys' baseball: 1977
 Boys' basketball 1967
 Football: 1960, 1965
 Wrestling: 1961, 1966, 2013
 Track and field: 1973, 1987
 Cheerleading: 2015, 2016

Notable alumni
 Bruce Abbott - actor
 Michelle Clunie - actress
 Samson Ebukam - NFL player with the Rams; 4th Round pick in the 2017 NFL Draft
 Sam Elliott - actor 
 Dennis Gassner - set designer
 John Jaha - baseball player
 Members of the band The Kingsmen
 Jeff Merkley - United States Senator
 Gary W. Martini - Medal of Honor U.S. Marine Corps Vietnam War
 Barbara Niven - actress
 Osa Odighizuwa - NFL player
 Owamagbe Odighizuwa - NFL player with the Giants; 3rd Round pick in the 2015 NFL draft
 Kim M. Peyton-McDonald - Olympic gold medal swimmer, 1976 Summer Olympics
 Pete Pierson - football player
 Lindsay Wagner - actress
 Claxton Welch - Super Bowl winner with the Dallas Cowboys
 Juston Wood - football player

References
 Olson, Lynn. The School-to-work Revolution: How Employers And Educators Are Joining Forces To Prepare Tomorrow's Skilled Workforce. Da Capo Press, August 28, 1998. , 9780738200293.

Notes

https://www.ddouglas.k12.or.us/wp-content/uploads/2019/10/October-2019-Enrollment.pdf

External links
 David Douglas High School

High schools in Portland, Oregon
Educational institutions established in 1954
Public high schools in Oregon
1954 establishments in Oregon